Dera Alampur Gondlan is a village in Tehsil Kharian, in the Gujrat District of Punjab, Pakistan. It is located at 32°47'N 73°49.4'E at an altitude of 900 feet. It is attached with city by Mohri road and by Dinga road. Conselour: CH Rizwan Farzand Gondal/

Populated places in Gujrat District